Glyphidocera zophocrossa is a moth in the family Autostichidae. It was described by Edward Meyrick in 1929. It is found in Trinidad and Costa Rica.

The wingspan is 13–14 mm. The forewings are ochreous, thinly sprinkled with dark fuscous. The stigmata are cloudy, dark fuscous, the plical rather obliquely before the first discal, an additional dot beneath and somewhat before the second discal, or these sometimes connected. There is sometimes some greyish suffusion towards the termen. A slender cloudy dark fuscous streak is found along the upper part of the termen, sometimes tending to form three dots. The hindwings are grey.

References

Moths described in 1929
Glyphidocerinae